The following lists events that happened during 1968 in Cape Verde.

Incumbents
Colonial governor: Leão Maria Tavares Rosado do Sacramento Monteiro

Events

Sports
CS Mindelense won the Cape Verdean Football Championship

Births
October 20: Cao, footballer who spent his career in Portugal

References

 
1968 in the Portuguese Empire
Years of the 20th century in Cape Verde
1960s in Cape Verde
Cape Verde
Cape Verde